Juvai Semaring Airport  is an airport serving Long Bawan, located in the province of North Kalimantan in Indonesia. It is also known as Long Bawan Airport.

Location 
The airport is located in the village of Long Bawan in North Kalimantan, which is located near the border with Malaysia.

Facilities
It has one runway designated 04/22 which measures .

Airlines and destinations

References

External links
 

Airports in North Kalimantan